Tug Agan Barracks is a military station located in Ndola, Zambia. It is one of the six major military stations in Zambia.

References 

Ndola
Barracks in Zambia